Ladda tona is a species of butterfly in the family Hesperiidae. It is found in Peru and Brazil.

References

Butterflies described in 1955